Vedanta University is a proposed, private, multi-disciplinary, co-educational university to be started by Anil Agarwal of Vedanta Resources corporation near Puri-Konark highway, Odisha, India.  According to the news reports and as of Sep 2010, the plans of the university was a closed chapter. However, in late April 2015 a revival of the project was initiated; The ex-Chief Secretary of Odisha, Mr. Bijay Patnaik, was hired as the President of the Vedanta University Project to revive this project.

The vision

Anil Agarwal, an Indian businessman, who heads the London based Vedanta Resources corporation and Naveen Patnaik, the Chief Minister of Odisha state in eastern India, had signed a memorandum of understanding to create a world class, multidisciplinary university, Vedanta University.  The university, which would be entirely a not-for-profit venture, was planned to be funded from Agarwal's personal funds Sam Pitroda, the chairman of the Knowledge Commission was the choice of the first chancellor of Vedanta University. Recent reports also suggest that at least three Nobel laureates have been contracted to join the university.  In July 2009, the government of Orissa passed a landmark bill to allow the massive university to be set up and function with autonomy.

Academics and research
According to the Anil Agarwal Foundation, the university was being modeled most closely on Stanford University and aims to be a peer institution to Stanford in terms of world-class research and education.

Schools and colleges
Engineering
Medicine
Business
Liberal Arts
Sciences
Law
Performing Arts

Centers of excellence
Health Sciences
Manufacturing Sciences
Agricultural Research
Rural Economics
Information & Communication Technology
Pharmaceutical Research
Urban Planning
Nanotechnology
Biotechnology

Campus and township
The foundation has identified  of land near the Puri-Konark marine drive between Nuanai and Balighai for the proposed Vedanta University. However the land acquisition for the university has hit a roadblock with the Supreme court ordering a status quo and hence the project has been stayed.

Environmental violations 
Several environmental violations were raised against the university which resulted in cases in the High court and the Supreme Court. In May 2010, Government of India asked the Anil Agarwal Foundation to stall the construction of the proposed Vedanta University at Puri to address issues related to environmental violations in the project.

Controversies

An academic has questioned whether, given its location and size, Vedanta can achieve its aims of being a leading research university. A rejoinder was also published. Another criticism leveled at the university, by politicians, local academicians, and the farmers currently occupying the proposed site relates to the relatively vast area of the proposed campus and its large student intake, although a few individual opinions differ.

Legal issues

High Court declares land acquisition for the university as illegal and void   
On 16 November 2010, the Orissa High Court declared the land acquisition for the Rs 15,000-crore Vedanta University project in Puri town as illegal and void

Supreme Court - status quo on all land acquisition for Vedanta 
A couple of months later, the Supreme court of India based in New Delhi ordered a stay or status Quo on all acquisition proceedings.

University was a closed chapter for four plus years 
News paper reports appeared saying that the university is a closed chapter.

Revival attempt starting 30 April 2015 
A revival of the project is being  tried with the hiring of the ex-Chief Secretary of Odisha, Mr. Bijay Patnaik, as the President of the Vedanta University Project.  He joined this position on 30 April 2015.
 
 
He told TOI

that his priority would be to expedite the decision in the supreme court case. Asked about potential conflict of interest, he said that such a question does not arise as the project he has joined has nothing to do with Vedanta as a company and he personally feels that the university is a desirable project that should take shape in the interest of Odisha. In an interview with Telegraph
  he discusses more details on his task in reviving Vedanta University. He also gave an interview
 (in Odia) to OTV, a major cable channel in Odisha where he addresses many questions that has been raised by the media on this issue.

Some signs of a possible revival were earlier reported in September 2014 

and December 2014.

However, prior to that, in the previous years (2012, 2013), Anil Agarwal in some of his interviews did talk about his continuing interest in establishing Vedanta University.
See for example: 

The Supreme court of India on 28 November 2016 gave some positive indications that it may allow Vedanta University. The Chief Justice of the Supreme Court of India and a member of the bench hearing this case, Justice T.S. Thakur, is quoted to have said "Why should anyone oppose setting up of a world class university which will give opportunity to over one lakh students? If somebody is making an investment of Rs 2,500 crore in education, why should somebody oppose it? Students will benefit. Public would benefit."  

The Supreme Court bench seems to have suggested that the  court may monitor the setting up of the university so as to make sure that the land is used for the 
university and not for commercial purposes.

Following that, the promoter, Mr. Anil Agarwal, said to OTV in Bhubaneswar: "We will definitely go ahead with the plan to set up the university".

See also
 Higher education in Orissa

Footnotes

References
 SC Orders status quo on Vedanta University
Vedanta University Official Site
Anil Agarwal
New Indian university modeled after Stanford
Baltimore architects hired to design new Indian university
Indian Foundation Will Give $1-Billion to Create a Huge Research University
Billionaire Proposes New Research University
The Anil Agarwal Foundation Announces a Memorandum of Understanding with the Government of Orissa to Establish Vedanta University
Vedanta, Orissa to sign MoU for mega varsity
Orissa to have world class Vedanta University
And a $3 billion hope for education
Orissa’s $3 bn to Vedanta varsity
Giving big: Largest gifts to colleges
$1 billion investment inspired India's new Vedanta University
Vedanta University
Top-notch Univ to come up in Orissa (CNN-IBN video)
U.S. firm unveils masterplan for Indian university
"In Rural India, an Ambitious Academic Vision" Chronicle of Higher Education, 13 July 2007.
For Planners, the Opportunity of a Lifetime
In Rural India, an Ambitious Academic Vision Chronicle of Higher Education, July, 2007.
Indian college to be modeled after Stanford
Campus Politics
Higher and Bigger Education in Orissa

Universities in Odisha
2006 in education
Puri
Vedanta Resources
Proposed buildings and structures in India